The United States–Venezuela Maritime Boundary Treaty is a 1978 treaty between the United States and Venezuela which delimits the maritime boundary between Venezuelan islands in the Caribbean Sea and the American territories of Puerto Rico and the United States Virgin Islands.

The treaty was signed in Caracas on 28 March 1978. Two-thirds of the boundary is an equidistant line between the U.S. Virgin Islands and Aves Island. The far eastern point of the boundary is a tripoint with the Netherlands Antilles and the far western point is a quadripoint with the Netherlands Antilles and the Dominican Republic.

The treaty came into force on 24 November 1980 after it had been ratified by both states. The full name of the treaty is Maritime boundary Treaty between the United States of America and the Republic of Venezuela.

See also
Borders of Venezuela
Netherlands–Venezuela Boundary Treaty
United States–Venezuela relations

Notes

References
 Anderson, Ewan W. (2003). International Boundaries: A Geopolitical Atlas. Routledge: New York. ;  OCLC 54061586
 Charney, Jonathan I., David A. Colson, Robert W. Smith. (2005). International Maritime Boundaries, 5 vols. Hotei Publishing: Leiden. ; ; ; ; ;  OCLC 23254092

External links
Full text of treaty with U.S. State Department commentary

1978 in the Caribbean
1978 in Venezuela
1978 in the United States
Treaties concluded in 1978
Treaties entered into force in 1980
Borders of Puerto Rico
Borders of the United States Virgin Islands
Borders of Venezuela
Boundary treaties
Treaties of the United States
Treaties of Venezuela
United States–Venezuela relations
United Nations treaties
Treaties extended to Puerto Rico
Treaties extended to the United States Virgin Islands